LiteWing Aircraft was an American aircraft manufacturer based in Caryville, Tennessee. The company specialized in the design and manufacture of ultralight trikes in the form of kits for amateur construction and ready-to-fly aircraft under the US FAR 103 Ultralight Vehicles rules.

The company seems to have gone out of business about 2000.

The company built two models, the LiteWing for the US homebuilt category and The Lite Trike for the ultralight category.

Aircraft

References

 
Defunct aircraft manufacturers of the United States
Ultralight aircraft
Homebuilt aircraft
Ultralight trikes